Bir Uttam Shaheed Mahbub Cantonment (also known as Kholahati Cantonment) is a Bangladeshi military cantonment in Parbatipur, Dinajpur District, Bangladesh. The Headquarters of 66th Artillery Brigade and 16th Infantry Brigade under 66th Infantry division are situated here.
It was named after the great martyr of liberation war, Bir Uttam Shaheed Captain Mahbububur Rahman[1944 - 1971], who was a pride of the district.

Education
 Cantonment Public School & College, Kholahati.
 Cantonment Board High School, BUSMS

References

Cantonments of Bangladesh
Parbatipur Upazila